Ragusa is a surname. Notable people with the surname include:

 Antonino Ragusa, (born 1990) Italian footballer
 Cinzia Ragusa (born 1977), Italian water polo player
 Eleonora Ragusa (1861–1939), also known as Kiyohara Tama, Kiyohara Otama, or Ragusa Tama, Japanese painter
 Kym Ragusa (born 1966), American writer and film director
 Vincenzo Ragusa (1841–1927), Italian sculptor